American Girl is a 2002 American comedy-drama film directed by Jordan Brady and starring Jena Malone, Brad Renfro, Michelle Forbes, Alicia Witt, and Erik von Detten.  The film premiered on October 14, 2002 at the Austin Film Festival. It was later released to DVD on January 11, 2005 under the title Confessions of an American Girl.

Plot
Rena is a suicidal teenage girl whose father is serving a long prison sentence. The boy she likes only uses her for sex, and other teenage girls tease her relentlessly.

Rena and her family travel to the father's prison for the annual family picnic. Things seem to be going just fine, but he eventually becomes abusive and angry. Rena's brother Jay, who is secretly gay, wanders off to tour the prison with another inmate named Buddy. Rena's half-sister Barbie sneaks off to the conjugal visit trailers and engages in sexual intercourse with her stepfather (Rena's father), unbeknownst to the family. After this activity is witnessed by Buddy and Jay, the other inmates watch as Buddy makes her squeal like a pig in exchange for not reporting it to her mother. Jay and Buddy bond, and when the tour is over they secretly kiss passionately.

Rena tells her dad that she's pregnant, news which the father does not handle well. When Rena's mother later discovers that her husband is having an affair, they get into a physical fight. When the guards see this they attack him and he stumbles backwards and falls on Rena. Rena rushes to the bathroom, finding that she's bled, and lost the baby. She breaks a picture frame and uses the glass shards to slit her wrists, but Jay saves her just in time.

Rena's mother (Madge) and the children realize that the father is abusive and that continuing to support him has been holding the family back. Rena realizes that her "fond" memories of her relationship with her father were self-delusions. Madge announces that she is moving the family to Florida. Rena tells her boyfriend about the miscarriage and when he expresses indifference, she causes his prized car to drive into a swimming pool. The end shows the family leaving home for Florida, with Rena's now ex-boyfriend running through the yard screaming at her.

Cast
 Jena Malone as Rena Grubb
 Brad Renfro as Jay Grubb
 Erik von Detten as Kenton
 Alicia Witt as Barbie
 Michelle Forbes as Madge Grubb
 Micole Mercurio as Faye
 Chris Mulkey as John Grubb
 Clifton Collins Jr. as Buddy

Critical reception
American Girl received mixed to negative reviews from critics. Jeff Paramchuk from DVD Talk website gave it three out of five stars and wrote that "there really is nothing wrong with this movie, but I can see how that it would not appeal to a very large group especially given its plot", he also says that "Confessions is a decent alternative from a lot of the teen movies that we see out in recent times, but not quite on par with films that get general release". David Nusair from Reel Film Reviews gave it one and a half out of four stars and wrote that the screenplay "emphasizing tired jokes over character development" and as a result "the film feels more like an extended sitcom pilot than anything else" and conclude that "unless your idea of a good time is watching an episode of Cops, it's highly unlikely you'll find much here to embrace."

References

External links
 
 
 

2002 films
2002 comedy-drama films
2002 LGBT-related films
2000s teen comedy-drama films
American teen comedy-drama films
American LGBT-related films
Films shot at Pinewood Studios
Films about self-harm
2000s English-language films
Films directed by Jordan Brady
2000s American films